al-Salameh is a Turkmen village in northern Aleppo Governorate, northwestern Syria.

The village administratively belongs to Nahiya Azaz in Azaz District. Nearby localities include Nayarah  to the east, and Shamarikh  to the northeast. In the 2004 census, Bab al-Salameh had a population of 1,408.

History
Traveler Martin Hartmann noted the village as a Turkish village in late 19th century.

References

Syria–Turkey border crossings
Populated places in Azaz District
Turkmen communities in Syria